Stefan Glarner (born 21 November 1987) is a Swiss footballer who plays for FC Köniz in the Swiss 1. Liga.

Career statistics

References

External links 
 Weltfussball profile 

1987 births
Living people
People from Interlaken-Oberhasli District
Swiss men's footballers
Switzerland under-21 international footballers
Association football midfielders
FC Thun players
FC Sion players
FC Zürich players
FC Köniz players
Swiss Super League players
Swiss Challenge League players
Swiss Promotion League players
Swiss 1. Liga (football) players
Sportspeople from the canton of Bern